Condequinto is a station of the Seville Metro on line 1 named after the neighborhood of Condequinto, Dos Hermanas. It is located close to Utrera road and Montequinto Av. Condequinto is a ground type building with elevated hall. The station is situated between Pablo de Olavide and Montequinto on the same line. It was opened on 2 April 2009.

See also
 List of Seville metro stations

References

External links 
  Official site.
 History, construction details and maps.

Seville Metro stations
Railway stations in Spain opened in 2009